C35 is a secondary route in Namibia that runs from C34 in Henties Bay, up to the Angolan-Namibian border in Ruacana. 

The C34 is intersected by the C36 at Uis, the C39 at Khorixas, and the C40 at Kamanjab. 

It has been described as one of Namibia's "most desolate roads".

References 

Roads in Namibia